MuchAdrenaline is a one-hour program on MuchMusic devoted to action sports and music. The series premiered on Monday, August 28 and currently airs on Mondays at 7pm ET.

The series showcases popular (and emerging) action sports from across Canada and around the world including skateboarding, surfing, snowboarding, BMX, motocross, mountain biking and wakeboarding. MuchAdrenaline also plays music videos from bands and artists associated with the action sports lifestyle.

References

MuchMusic media information, Fall 2006 programming notebook, accessed 14 August 2006

Much (TV channel) original programming
2000s Canadian reality television series
2000s Canadian sports television series
2006 Canadian television series debuts